BioValley may refer to:

 Biotechnology industrial park, a generic term
 BioValley (Europe)
 BioValley (Malaysia)
 Bionic Valley (Utah)

See also 

 Silicon Alley
 Silicon Hills
 Silicon Valley
 Tech Valley